Laura Mary Catherine Beatty (née Keen; born 1 May 1963) is a writer awarded the Authors' Club First Novel Award for her 2008 novel Pollard, also shortlisted for the Ondaatje Prize.

She has also written two biographies, the first about Lillie Langtry which contained the first publication of correspondence between Lillie and her lover Arthur Jones.

Personal life 
She is the daughter of Charles Keen and Lady Priscilla Mary Rose Curzon, eldest daughter of Edward Curzon, 6th Earl Howe. Her brother is actor Will Keen (father of actress Dafne Keen) and her sister is poet Alice Oswald. On 29 September 1990, she married the Hon. Nicholas Beatty, son of David Field Beatty, 2nd Earl Beatty. They have one son, David Brin Charles Beatty (born 1992).

Bibliography

Non-fiction
Lillie Langtry, Manner, Masks and Morals (1999, Chatto & Windus)
Anne Boleyn, The Wife Who Lost Her Head (2001, Short Books, for children aged 10+)

Fiction
Pollard (2008, Chatto & Windus)
Darkling (2014, Chatto & Windus)
Lost Property (2019, Atlantic Books)

References

1963 births
English women novelists
English biographers
Laura
Living people
People from West Northamptonshire District
21st-century British novelists
21st-century English women writers
21st-century biographers
English women non-fiction writers
Women biographers